Gauberi (also Romanized as Gāūberī; also known as Gāberī) is a village in Godeh Rural District, in the Central District of Bastak County, Hormozgan Province, Iran. At the 2006 census, its population was 284, in 59 families.

References 

Populated places in Bastak County